Harmologa speciosa is a species of moth of the family Tortricidae. It is found in New Zealand.

The wingspan is about 14 mm. The forewings are white with ferruginous markings, mixed with ochreous and black. The hindwings are dark fuscous.

References

Moths described in 1927
Archipini